Mack may refer to:

People
Mack (given name)
Mack (surname)
Reinhold Mack, German record producer and sound engineer, often credited as simply "Mack"
Richard Machowicz (1965–2017), host of FutureWeapons and Deadliest Warrior, known as "Mack"

Places

United States 
Mack, Colorado, an unincorporated town
Mack, Louisiana, an unincorporated community
Mack, Minnesota, an unincorporated town
Mack, Ohio, a census-designated place

Bahamas 
Mack Town

Businesses
Mack Trucks, an American truck maker
Mack Group, an American corporation providing contract manufacturing
Mack Brewery, a Norwegian brewery
Mack Rides, a German ride manufacturer
Mack Air, a Botswana air charter line
Mack (publishing), an art and photography publishing house based in London

Other uses
USS Mack (DE-358), a destroyer escort which served in World War II
Mack (naval architecture), in naval architecture, a structure combining a ship's radar masts and funnels
The Mack, a 1973 blaxploitation film
Mack Park, original home field of the Detroit Stars Negro National League baseball franchise
Mack is the Character of Disney Pixar Cars.

See also

Macks Creek, Missouri, USA;
Mac (disambiguation)
Mach (disambiguation)
Mak (disambiguation)
Mark (disambiguation)